Torbeqan (also Romanized as Torbeqān) is a village in Bala Velayat Rural District, in the Central District of Kashmar County, Razavi Khorasan Province, Iran. At the 2006 census, its population was 1,515, in 420 families.

Torbaghan village is one of the oldest villages in Kashmar. Oldests say: "Tarbaghan is one of the old Sultanate settlements that became famous in the days of the Mongol invasion following their campaign against the invaders under its current name. Torbaghan at that time was a rural village full of orchards. The gardens of these gardens were spectacular. In the ancient dialect of the Great Khorasan period, the word garden was used for the garden house. The ungoverned radishes had taken a stand against the invaders in their gardens. From that time on, this area was called the radish, which over time became the radish. " Respected architects are respected. Alongside this interpretation, they say that the radish has a definition of a garden with a refreshing garden. Whatever the name of this township, it is evidence of its longevity. The Dehkhoda Dictionary reads: "Raising is from Balwait district in the Kashmir suburbs. Kashmir lies on the road to General Malbru on the southwest of Kashmir. Its water comes from aqueducts and cereals, fruits and grapes, cotton and cumin. The job is farming and carpet weaving.

This village is located east of Kashmar in a one-way line parallel to the Kashmar-Faizabad and Old Kashmar-Mashhad axes. have been. The proximity of Abadi to the Sultanate had made it possible for caravans, passers-by and riders to choose this village. The remains of two faucets are proof of this claim

References 

Populated places in Kashmar County